Yonas Kinde (born 7 May 1980) is a track and field athlete originally from Ethiopia, but now living and training in Luxembourg, who was selected by the International Olympic Committee (IOC) to compete for the Refugee Olympic Team at the 2016 Summer Olympics in Rio de Janeiro, Brazil. He is coached by Yves Göldi. Yonas ran his fastest marathon with a time of 2 hours 17 minutes.

Personal life
Yonas, originally from Ethiopia. He has been living in Luxembourg since 2012 and under international protection in Luxembourg since 2013. Yonas speaks French, English, Luxembourgish and Amharic, and works as Massage therapist.

Athletics career
Yonas began running in Ethiopia as a teenager mainly in cross-country, 10,000m and half marathons, eventually moving up to the full marathon. During his relatively short running career in Europe, coached by Yves Göldi, he won several titles in Luxembourg, France and Germany. In Frankfurt, Germany he ran his personal best in 2015 in 2 hours and 17 minutes.

Due to his refugee status, Yonas could not compete at international competitions, despite being fast enough to have qualified. On 3 July 2016, the IOC announced that Yonas would be part of a team of ten athletes selected to compete as a Refugee Olympic Athletes team at the 2016 Summer Olympics in Rio de Janeiro, Brazil. He competed in the men's marathon.

Competitions

Personal bests
 1500 m – 3:56.56	in Kirchberg (LUX) on 18.02.2014
 3000 m – 8:38.10	in Kirchberg (LUX) on 30.01.2016
 5000 m – 14:32.69 in Schifflange (LUX) on 04.08.2013
 8 km Road – 23:05 in Trier (GER) on 31.12.2013
 10 km Road – 30:01 in Langsur (GER) on 09.11.2013
 Half marathon – 1:03:22	in Remich (LUX) on 28.09.2014
 Marathon – 2:17:31 in Frankfurt (GER) on 25.10.2015

References

External links
 Profile  at all.athletics.com 
 
 Article about Yonas

Living people
1980 births
Ethiopian male long-distance runners
Ethiopian male marathon runners
Ethiopian taxi drivers
Refugees in Europe
Refugee Olympic Team at the 2016 Summer Olympics
20th-century Ethiopian people
21st-century Ethiopian people